Laurent Botokeky (5 December 1919 in Bosy, Madagascar – 1987) was a politician from Madagascar who was elected to the French Senate in 1958.

References 
 page on the French Senate website
Madagascar: Dictionnaire des personnalités historiques

Malagasy politicians
French Senators of the Fourth Republic
1919 births
1987 deaths
Senators of French East Africa
Malagasy expatriates in France